Cycling was contested at the 1951 Asian Games in New Delhi, India from March 6 to March 8. Cyclists from four countries, India, Japan, Iran and Burma participated in this sport.

Medalists

Road

Track

Medal table

References
 Results

 
1951 Asian Games events
1951
Asian Games
1951 in road cycling
1951 in track cycling
International cycle races hosted by India